Rossella Ratto (born 20 October 1993) is an Italian former racing cyclist, who rode professionally between 2012 and 2021 for seven different teams.

Personal life
Ratto's brother, Daniele Ratto, also competed professionally in cycling, including winning the fourteenth stage of the 2013 Vuelta a España.

Major results
Source:

2008
 2nd Time trial, National Novice Road Championships
2009
 1st  Time trial, National Novice Road Championships
2010
 2nd  Road race, UCI Juniors Road World Championships
 2nd Memorial Davide Fardelli Chrono
 3rd  Road race, UEC European Junior Road Championships
 National Junior Road Championships
3rd Road race
3rd Time trial
2011
 UEC European Junior Road Championships
1st  Road race
1st  Time trial
 3rd Memorial Davide Fardelli Chrono
2012
 5th Overall Giro del Trentino Alto Adige-Südtirol
 6th Road race, UCI Road World Championships
 6th Grand Prix el Salvador
 7th Overall Vuelta a El Salvador
 7th Overall Giro della Toscana Int. Femminile – Memorial Michela Fanini
1st Young rider classification
 8th Grand Prix GSB
2013
 UEC European Under-23 Road Championships
2nd  Time trial
4th Road race
 3rd  Road race, UCI Road World Championships
 3rd Road race, National Road Championships
 4th Overall Tour Cycliste Féminin International de l'Ardèche
 7th Holland Hills Classic
 8th Overall Belgium Tour
 8th Trofeo Alfredo Binda-Comune di Cittiglio
 8th Gooik–Geraardsbergen–Gooik
 8th Durango-Durango Emakumeen Saria
 8th Open de Suède Vårgårda
 10th Overall Giro del Trentino Alto Adige-Südtirol
1st Mountains classification
 10th GP de Plouay
2014
 1st Giro dell'Emilia Internazionale Donne Elite
 3rd Overall The Women's Tour
1st  Young rider classification
1st Stage 2
 3rd Giro del Trentino Alto Adige-Südtirol
 4th Overall Auensteiner-Radsporttage
1st Mountains classification
1st Young rider classification
 4th Overall Ladies Tour of Norway
 4th Overall Tour Cycliste Féminin International de l'Ardèche
1st Mountains classification
 4th GP de Plouay
 UEC European Under-23 Road Championships
8th Time trial
10th Road race
 8th EPZ Omloop van Borsele
 10th Durango-Durango Emakumeen Saria
2015
 3rd Overall Tour Cycliste Féminin International de l'Ardèche
1st Young rider classification
 5th Road race, European Games
2016
 1st Winston-Salem Cycling Classic
 7th Durango-Durango Emakumeen Saria
2017
 3rd Giro dell'Emilia Internazionale Donne Elite
2018
 3rd Time trial, National Road Championships
 10th Liège–Bastogne–Liège

References

External links

 
 

1993 births
Living people
Italian female cyclists
People from Moncalieri
Cyclists at the 2015 European Games
European Games competitors for Italy
Cyclists of Fiamme Azzurre
Cyclists from Piedmont
Sportspeople from the Metropolitan City of Turin